In cricket, a five-wicket haul (also known as a "five–for" or "fifer") refers to a bowler taking five or more wickets in a single innings. A five-wicket haul on debut is regarded by the critics as a notable achievement. As of May 2021, 159 cricketers have taken a five-wicket haul on Test match debut, out of which twenty-four were from the South Africa national cricket team. The five-wicket hauls have come against six different opponents, and the South Africans have performed this feat fifteen times against England. Of the twenty-two matches where a South African debutant has taken a five-wicket haul, twelve have ended in defeat, six in victory and the other four in a draw. The five-wicket hauls were taken at eleven different venues, with six of them being taken at the Newlands Cricket Ground, Cape Town.

Albert Rose-Innes was the first South African to take a five-wicket haul on Test cricket debut. He took 5 wickets for 43 runs against England in 1889. In the second Test of the series, Gobo Ashley took 7 wickets for 95 runs, in what turned out to be his only appearance in Test cricket. When the country was re-admitted to play competitive cricket in 1991, Lance Klusener became the first debutant to take a five-wicket haul. His 8 wickets for 64 runs against India in November 1996 remain the best bowling figures in an innings by a South African on debut. Sydney Burke and Alf Hall are the only South African debutants to collect 10 or more wickets in a match as of February 2015. Klusener's figures, along with George Bissett's 5 for 37 runs, were included among the "Top 100 Bowling performances of all time" by the Wisden Cricketers' Almanack in 2002. Beuran Hendricks is the most recent South African cricketer to achieve this feat, taking figures of 5 wickets for 64 runs against England in January 2020.

Key

Five-wicket hauls

Notes

References

South Africa

Test